Brian Spencer Eifler is a United States Army Major General currently serving as the commanding general of the 11th Airborne Division and the Deputy Commander of Alaskan Command. He assumed command of United States Army Alaska (USARAK) on 21 July 2021. On 6 June 2022 USARAK reflagged to 11th Airborne Division as part of the implementation of the Army's arctic strategy. He has also served as the Deputy Commander for Operations of the 10th Mountain Division and Operation Inherent Resolve from July 2017 to November 2018.

Military career 

In 1990, Eifler graduated from Central Michigan University with a bachelor's degree in Interpersonal and Public Communication, gaining a commission as an infantry officer via the Reserve Officer's Training Corps program. As part as his professional military education, he went on to also graduate from the United States Army Command and General Staff College and the United States Army War College.

As the commanding general of 11th Airborne Division and the Deputy Commander of Alaskan Command, Eifler plays a vital role in the implementation of the United States Arctic Strategy.

Promotions

Recent Assignments 
Eifler's recent assignments include Commanding General, United States Army Alaska; Chief, Legislative Liaison, Office of the Secretary of the Army; Deputy Commanding General (Operations), 10th Mountain Division and Operation Inherent Resolve

Awards and decorations

References 

United States Army generals
Central Michigan University alumni
People from Michigan
Recipients of the Legion of Merit
Recipients of the Defense Superior Service Medal
United States Army Rangers
Military personnel from Michigan
Living people
1968 births